Confidence is a 1980 Hungarian film directed by István Szabó set in the final days of World War II. It follows two resistance members who must pose as husband and wife to stay safe from the Nazis, even though they are each married to other people. Critically acclaimed, it won Szabó the Silver Bear for Best Director at the 30th Berlin International Film Festival and was nominated for the Academy Award for Best Foreign Language Film at the 53rd Academy Awards.

Plot
Towards the end of World War II, during the siege of Budapest, Kata (Ildikó Bánsági) is intercepted on her way home from the cinema, and informed that her apartment is being searched and that her daughter and husband, who is part of the Hungarian resistance, have already fled to safety. With false papers, under the name Mrs. János Bíró, she has to hide in a house in the suburbs together with her "husband" (Péter Andorai), an important person in the resistance movement. In their shared room, János treats Kata coldly and tries to explain life in hiding, telling her she cannot leave the house without his permission nor discuss any personal details with anyone.

Gradually, the closeness, threat of discovery, and a mutual attraction lead to an affair between them; János tries to push Kata away, having been betrayed to the Gestapo by a lover in Germany ten years earlier. Over time, his defences begin to fall and he allows himself to fall in love with Kata. Later, when Kata goes to meet her real husband, she feels guilty. János begins to overcome his fear and paranoia, but by the time he accepts that he loves Kata, he has managed to destroy the relationship.

After the war ends and the siege is lifted, a car arrives for János, who leaves Kata with a promise to contact her in the next few days. Kata has to prove her identity before a verification committee, but cannot, as her original papers were destroyed when she went into hiding, and only János can vouch for her true identity. Kata reluctantly finds herself back with her husband, while János appears at the verification centre and calls for his "wife" among the people standing in line.

Cast
Ildikó Bánsági	... 	Kata
Péter Andorai	... 	János
Oszkárné Gombik	... 	A néni
Károly Csáki	... 	A bácsi
Ildikó Kishonti	... 	Erzsi
Lajos Balázsovits	... 	Kata férje
Tamás Dunai	... 	Günther Hoffmann
Zoltán Bezerédi	... 	Pali
Éva Bartis		
Béla Éless		(as Béla Éles)
Danielle du Tombe	... 	Elza
Gyula Gazdag	... 	Egy férfi
Gyöngyi Dorogi		
László Littmann	... 	Dr. Czakó (as dr. Littmann László)
Judit Halász	... 	János felesége

See also
 List of submissions to the 53rd Academy Awards for Best Foreign Language Film
 List of Hungarian submissions for the Academy Award for Best Foreign Language Film

References

External links
 

1980 films
1980s war drama films
1980s Hungarian-language films
Films directed by István Szabó
Hungarian World War II films
Hungarian war drama films
1980 drama films